Dona Hardy (December 3, 1912 – February 13, 2011), sometimes misspelled as Donna Hardy, was an American film and television actress.

Early life
Jean Dona Barley was born December 3, 1912 in Los Angeles to Ethel Macgillivoy Barley. In the early 1930s she toured the United States with a dance troupe, but left and returned to her native Los Angeles during the Depression. She briefly dated an up-and-coming, but still largely unknown, actor named Anthony Quinn. She was the Executive Director of a United Way affiliate, and retired at age 66, when she looked to begin her acting career.

Acting career
Hardy began her acting career late in life, usually playing sweet, sometimes deceptively harmless-looking old ladies. During her acting career, Hardy bedded John Ritter, kissed Matthew Perry, and, fitted with a walker, was asked by faux-auteur Jerry Stiller (in an episode of The King of Queens) to consider "some tasteful nudity" for a community theater production of The Gin Game. She worked with Arnold Schwarzenegger and Richard Dawson in her first film credit, the Stephen King-penned thriller, The Running Man, in which she had played "Mrs. McArdle" and had to say the word "motherfucker". "There is nothing that people enjoy so much as hearing old people say dirty words.... I don't know what's so attractive about that, but every old lady knows she is going to be asked to say the 'F' word sooner or later." Her second film credit, When Harry Met Sally..., was her favorite film. Her last role was in 2010.

Personal life
She married Irving Hardekopf in 1946; the couple adopted a son and remained together until his death in 1980. Widowed, she adapted her acting name from a shortened version of her married name. In 2009, she relocated with her son, Bill, a former president/general manager of the Birmingham Barons, to the Birmingham area, where she died on February 13, 2011, aged 98.

Selected filmography

Films
 The Running Man (1987) - Mrs. McArdle
 When Harry Met Sally... (1989) - Documentary Couple #10
 Shattered (1991) - Pet Shop Woman
 We're Talking Serious Money (1992) - Old Lady
 Universal Soldier (1992) - Old Woman
 Rave Review (1994) - Complaining Patron
 The Cable Guy (1996) - Karaoke Party Guest
 Dogtown (1997) - Other Cast
 The Truman Show (1998) - Senior Citizen
 Civility (2000) - Danni
 Nurse Betty (2000) - Woman Patient
 Sordid Lives (2000) - Mrs. King (Organist)
 Attention Shoppers (2000) - Old Woman
 Serial Killing 4 Dummys (2004) - Rose
 You Did What? (2006) - Neighbor
 Choose Connor (2007) - Old Woman
 Superbad (2007) - Old Lady
 Extreme Movie (2008) - Molly
 Timer (2009) - Sadie
 Spork (2010) - Old Lady
 How to Make Love to a Woman (2010) - Grandma Conners (final film role)

Television
 Quantum Leap (1989) - Grey Haired Lady
 Designing Women (1990, 1991) - Margaret / Mrs. Chesley
 Night Court (1992) - Margaret Keane
 Hearts Afire (1993, 1994) - Aunt Grace / Elderly Woman / Dorothy Bingham
 ER (1994, 2008) - Freda / Harriet
 The Nanny (1998) - Sister
 Reba (2002) - Mrs. Wolf
 Malcolm in the Middle (2003) - Old Lady
 Charmed (2004) - Old Paige
 The King of Queens (2005) - Minna
 My Name Is Earl (2006) - Hank's Grandmother
 Grey's Anatomy (2006) - Grace Bickham
 It's Always Sunny in Philadelphia (2006) - Old Woman
 Bones (2008) - Nadine Spring

References

External links
 (does not contain the correct spelling of Hardy's first name or her date of birth or places of birth and death)

1912 births
2011 deaths
American film actresses
American television actresses
Actresses from Los Angeles
21st-century American women